Trinyen Songtsen  (Tibetan: ཁྲི་གཉན་གཟུངས་བཙན; Wylie: Khri-gnyan gZung-btsan, Chinese:赤宁松赞) was the 29th King of Bod according to Tibetan legendary tradition. He was one of the legendary kings and the first of the so-called Pre-Imperial Period (493-630). Before him there were the so-called Five Unifying Kings whose names ended in Tsen.

Life 
Trinyen Songtsen was the son of Thothori Nyantsen

The Tibetan Annals state that like his father, Trinyen made offerings with Secret Antidotes and that this is why the kingdom grew during his rule.

It is also stated that Trinyen was buried at Donkhorda, the site of the royal tombs, to the right of his father Thothori's tomb.

References 

History of Tibet
Tibetan kings
5th-century births
6th-century rulers in Asia
537 deaths